Karol Miklosz (1915–2003) was a Polish-Soviet footballer, Soviet referee and Soviet-Ukrainian football administrator. Most of his career was spent playing for Ukraina Lwów and he later became president of FC Karpaty Lviv.

In 1938, he won the President of Poland's Football Cup with Ukraina Lwów, where he began his career and where he played till the Soviet Union invasion of Poland in 1939. After that, he played on Soviet teams till he retired as a player in 1947 and began a career as a referee. In 1945, Miklosz became a champion of the republican Dynamo Society (Dynamo Society of Ukraine).

From 1955 through 1968, Miklosz headed the Football Federation of Lviv Region. He was a director of FC Karpaty Lviv in 1968–1972, and a president of the club in 1990–1992.

References

1915 births
2003 deaths
Sportspeople from Lviv
People from the Kingdom of Galicia and Lodomeria
Ukrainian Austro-Hungarians
Polish footballers
Soviet football referees
Soviet footballers
Ukrainian footballers
Ukraina Lwow players
FC Dynamo Lviv players
FC Karpaty Lviv
Merited Coaches of Ukraine
Association football inside forwards
Burials at Yaniv Cemetery